Johnson County is located in the U.S. state of Iowa. As of the 2020 census, the population was 152,854, making it the fourth-most populous county in Iowa. The county seat is Iowa City, home of the University of Iowa. Johnson County is included in the Iowa City metropolitan area, which is also included in the Cedar Rapids-Iowa City Corridor Combined Statistical Area.

History
Johnson County was established in December 1837 by the legislature of the Wisconsin Territory, one of thirteen counties established by that body in a comprehensive act. The county's area was partitioned from Dubuque County, and was not initially provided with a civil government, instead being governed by Cedar County officials. It was originally named for the US Vice President Richard M. Johnson. In 2020, the Johnson County Board of Supervisors voted unanimously to change the county's namesake to be Lulu Merle Johnson, the first black woman in the state to get her doctorate.

The first courthouse in the county was a two-story log cabin structure, built in 1838 in the settlement of Napoleon, about two miles south of the current courthouse. The building stood across from what later would become the James McCollister Farmstead on land later owned by Philip Clark.

After Iowa City was established by fiat as the new territorial capitol of Iowa, the county seat was removed there. The second Johnson County Courthouse, the first in Iowa City, was built on Lot 8 Block 8 of the County Seat Addition to Iowa City in 1842 for $3,690. This location was in the southeast corner of the intersection of Harrison and Clinton Streets. The building was 56 x 28 feet and two stories tall. It was built by James Trimble, who had previously built the first jail.

A third courthouse was built in 1857 in the courthouse square on Clinton Street between Court and Harrison Streets. It was used until 1901, after cracks appeared in its south wall in 1899. The building was apparently built of brick with stone and wood ornamentation.

The Richardsonian Romanesque style courthouse in use today was designed by the firm of Rush, Bowman and Rush of Grand Rapids, Michigan. It was bid at a cost of $111,000 and built by the firm Rowson & Son of Johnson County. The cornerstone was laid in December 1899. The building's tower was based on Henry Hobson Richardson's design for the spire of Trinity Church in Boston. The building was dedicated on June 8, 1901. The currently unused jail that stands to the west of the courthouse was designed by C.L. Wundt of Burlington, Iowa on behalf of the Stewart Iron Works in Cleveland and bid for $14,000.

Geography

Major highways
 Interstate 80
 Interstate 380
 U.S. Highway 6
 U.S. Highway 218
 Iowa Highway 1
 Iowa Highway 22
 Iowa Highway 27

Transit
 Cambus
 Iowa City Transit
 List of intercity bus stops in Iowa

Adjacent counties
Benton County – northwest
Cedar County – east
Iowa County – west
Linn County – north
Muscatine County – east and southeast
Louisa County – southeast and south
Washington County – south

Demographics

2020 census
There were 65,916 housing units, of which 61,335 were occupied.

2010 census
There were 55,967 housing units, of which 52,715 were occupied.

2000 census

As of the census of 2000, there were 111,006 people, 44,080 households, and 23,582 families residing in the county. There were 45,831 housing units at an average density of 75 per square mile (29/km2). The racial makeup of the county was 90.13% White, 2.90% Black or African American, 0.28% Native American, 4.12% Asian, 0.04% Pacific Islander, 1.01% from other races, and 1.51% from two or more races. 2.51% of the population were Hispanic or Latino of any race.

There were 44,080 households, out of which 26.50% had children under the age of 18 living with them, 43.90% were married couples living together, 6.80% had a female householder with no husband present, and 46.50% were non-families. 30.20% of all households were made up of individuals, and 5.60% had someone living alone who was 65 years of age or older. The average household size was 2.34 and the average family size was 2.97.

Age spread: 20.10% under the age of 18, 23.40% from 18 to 24, 30.80% from 25 to 44, 18.20% from 45 to 64, and 7.40% who were 65 years of age or older. The median age was 28 years. For every 100 females, there were 99.10 males. For every 100 females age 18 and over, there were 97.30 males.

The median income for a household in the county was $40,060, and the median income for a family was $60,112. Males had a median income of $36,279 versus $29,793 for females. The per capita income for the county was $22,220. About 5.20% of families and 15.00% of the population were below the poverty line, including 8.10% of those under age 18 and 3.80% of those age 65 or over.

Politics
Largely due to the presence of the University of Iowa, Johnson County is considered the most liberal county in Iowa and a stronghold of the Democratic Party, and has always been among Iowa's most Democratic counties since the Civil War. It has been the strongest Democratic county in the state since 1984. This trend predates the recent swing toward the Democrats in counties influenced by college towns. The last Republican to win the county in a presidential election was Richard Nixon in 1960, and the last Republican to even get 40 percent of the county's vote was Ronald Reagan in 1984. As a measure of how strongly Democratic the county has been, Democrats easily carried it even in the national Republican landslides of 1972, 1984 and 1988, and the county was the only county in Iowa to vote for Democrat Alton B. Parker over Republican Theodore Roosevelt in 1904. In 2020, Joe Biden received the highest percentage of the vote received by any Democrat in the county's history; indeed, by any candidate of any party.

Johnson County's Democratic bent is just as pronounced at the state level. It is often the lone county to vote Democratic in statewide Republican landslides, such as Senator Chuck Grassley's re-elections in 2010 and 2016 or Governor Terry Branstad's re-election in 2014.

Communities

Cities

Coralville
Hills
Iowa City
Lone Tree
North Liberty
Oxford
Shueyville
Solon
Swisher
Tiffin
University Heights

Census-designated place
Frytown

Other unincorporated communities

Amish
Elmira
Cosgrove
Morse
Oasis
River Junction
Sharon Center
Sutliff
Windham

Ghost towns
Midway

Townships

Big Grove
Cedar
Clear Creek
East Lucas
Fremont
Graham
Hardin
Jefferson
Liberty
Lincoln
Madison
Monroe
Newport
Oxford
Penn
Pleasant Valley
Scott
Sharon
Union
Washington
West Lucas

Population ranking
The population ranking of the following table is based on the 2020 census of Johnson County.

† county seat

Notable natives
John T. Struble (1831–1916) early builder and farmer.
Grant Wood, artist.

See also

National Register of Historic Places listings in Johnson County, Iowa
Secrest Octagon Barn

References

Charles Ray Aurner, Leading Events in Johnson County, Iowa, History, Volume I (1912) reproduction by Torch Press, Cedar Rapids IA

External links

Johnson County Government
Johnson County Crisis Center
Johnson County website

 
1837 establishments in Wisconsin Territory
Populated places established in 1837
Iowa City metropolitan area